Beep may refer to:

Science and technology 
 Beep (sound), a single tone onomatopoeia, generally made by a computer or a machine
 BEEP, a network protocol framework
 Beep (locomotive), a locomotive built in 1970
 Beep (smart card),  contact less card payment scheme in the Philippines initially intended for use in railway stations and some buses.

Entertainment 
 Beep (short story), a 1954 novelette by James Blish
 "Beep" (The Pussycat Dolls song), a 2006 song performed by the Pussycat Dolls
 "Beep!!", a 2011 song performed by Superfly
 "Beep" (Bobby Valentino song), a 2008 song performed by Bobby Valentino
 Beep (video game), a 2011 2D-platforming action and adventure game by Big Fat Alien
 Beep: A Documentary History of Game Sound, a 2016 documentary by Karen Collins
 Gemaga, a Japanese video game magazine once known as Beep

Other 

 Beep (soft drink), a former Canadian fruit drink
 Beep test, oxygen uptake measuring multi-stage fitness test
 Basis point, one part per ten thousand
 BEEPS, Business Environment and Enterprise Performance Survey
 Beep, an informal nickname for borough presidents in New York City.

See also 
 Beep, beep (disambiguation)
 BEP (disambiguation)
 Beeb (disambiguation)
 Beeper (disambiguation)